The 2017–18 Championnat National season is the 20th season since its establishment. The fixtures were announced on 25 July 2017.

Team changes

To National
Promoted from CFA
  Cholet
  L'Entente
  Grenoble
  Rodez
Relegated from Ligue 2
 Red Star
 Laval

From National
Relegated to CFA
 Épinal
 CA Bastia
 Sedan
 Belfort
Promoted to Ligue 2
 Châteauroux
 Quevilly-Rouen
 Paris FC

Stadia and locations

League table

Promotion play-off
A promotion play-off will be held at the end of the season between the 18th-placed 2017–18 Ligue 2 team and the 3rd-placed team of Championnat National. This will be played over two legs on 22 and 27 May 2018.

Grenoble are promoted to 2018–19 Ligue 2

Top scorers

References

Championnat National seasons
France